Terebra is a genus of small to large-sized predatory sea snails, marine gastropod molluscs in the subfamily Terebrinae of the family Terebridae, the auger snails.

Species in this genus do not possess a radula.

Species
Species in the genus Terebra include:

 Terebra achates Weaver, 1960
 Terebra adamsii E. A. Smith, 1873
 Terebra aikeni Terryn & Welsh, 2020
 Terebra albocancellata Bratcher, 1988
 Terebra albomarginata Deshayes, 1859
 Terebra amanda Hinds, 1844
 Terebra anilis (Röding, 1798)
 Terebra archimedis Deshayes, 1859
 Terebra argosyia Olsson, 1971
 Terebra argus Hinds, 1844
 Terebra babylonia Lamarck, 1822
 Terebra balabacensis Aubry & Picardal, 2011
 Terebra bellanodosaGrabau & S. G. King, 1928
 Terebra binii Aubry, 2014
 Terebra boucheti Bratcher, 1981
 Terebra bratcherae Cernohorsky, 1987
 Terebra caddeyi Bratcher & Cernohorsky, 1982
 Terebra caelata A. Adams & Reeve, 1850
 † Terebra canalis S.V. Wood, 1828
 Terebra castaneostriata Kosuge, 1979
 Terebra cingulifera Lamarck, 1822
 Terebra circinata Deshayes, 1857
 Terebra cognata Smith, 1877
 Terebra commaculata (Gmelin, 1791)
 Terebra connelli Bratcher & Cernohorsky, 1985
 Terebra consobrina Deshayes, 1857
 Terebra corrugata Lamarck, 1822
 Terebra cossignanii Aubry, 2008
 Terebra cumingii Deshayes, 1857
 Terebra deshayesii Reeve, 1860
 Terebra donpisori Terryn, 2017
 Terebra elliscrossi Bratcher, 1979
 Terebra erythraeensis Terryn & Dekker, 2017
 † Terebra exilis Bell, 1871
 Terebra eximia Deshayes, 1859
 Terebra fenestrata Hinds, 1844
 Terebra fernandae Aubry, 1991
 Terebra fernandesi Bouchet, 1983
 Terebra fijiensis Smith, 1873
 Terebra floridana (Dall, 1889)
 Terebra formosa Deshayes, 1857
 Terebra fujitai Kuroda & Habe, 1952
 Terebra funiculata Hinds, 1844
 Terebra gabriellae Aubry, 2008
 Terebra gaiae Aubry, 2008
 Terebra giorgioi Aubry, 1999
 Terebra grayi E. A. Smith, 1877
 Terebra guineensis Bouchet, 1983
 Terebra guttata (Röding, 1798)
 Terebra helichrysum Melvill & Standen, 1903
 Terebra histrio Deshayes, 1857
 Terebra hoaraui Drivas & Jay, 1988
 Terebra insalli Bratcher & Burch, 1976
 † Terebra inversa Nyst, 1843
 Terebra irregularis Thiele, 1925
 Terebra jacksoniana Garrard, 1976
 Terebra jenningsi R. D. Burch, 1965
 Terebra kantori Terryn, 2017
 Terebra knudseni Bratcher, 1983
 Terebra laevigata Gray, 1834
 Terebra lauretanae Tenison-Woods, 1878
 Terebra levantina Aubry, 1999
 Terebra ligata Hinds, 1844
 Terebra lillianae Withney, 1976
 Terebra lima Deshayes, 1857
 Terebra lindae Petuch, 1987
 Terebra luandensis Aubry, 2008
 Terebra mamillata R. B. Watson, 1886
 Terebra mariesi E. A. Smith, 1880
 Terebra marrowae Bratcher & Cernohorsky, 1982
 Terebra montgomeryi Burch, 1965
 Terebra moolenbeeki Aubry, 1995
 Terebra neglecta (Poppe, Tagaro & Terryn, 2009)
 † Terebra niauensis Tröndlé & Letourneux, 2011
 Terebra nodularis Deshayes, 1859
 Terebra noumeaensis Aubry, 1999
 Terebra ornata Gray, 1834
 Terebra pellyi Smith, 1877
 Terebra picta Hinds, 1844
 Terebra polygonia Reeve, 1860
 Terebra praelonga Deshayes, 1859
 Terebra pretiosa Reeve, 1842
 † Terebra pseudopertusa Peyrot, 1931 
 Terebra pseudopicta Aubry, 2008
 Terebra pseudoturbonilla Talavera, 1975
 Terebra punctatostriata Gray, 1834
 Terebra punctum (Poppe, Tagaro & Terryn, 2009)
 Terebra quoygaimardi Cernohorsky, 1987 & Bratcher, 1976
 Terebra raybaudii (Aubry, 1993)
 Terebra reticularis (Pecchioli in Sacco, 1891)
 Terebra robusta Hinds, 1844
 Terebra rosae Aubry, 2015
 Terebra russetae (Garrard, 1976)
 Terebra salisburyi Drivas & Jay, 1998
 Terebra stearnsii Pilsbry, 1891
 Terebra straminea Gray, 1834
 Terebra subangulata Deshayes, 1859
 Terebra subulata (Linnaeus, 1767)
 Terebra succinea Hinds, 1844
 Terebra swobodai Bratcher, 1981
 Terebra tagaroae Terryn, 2017
 Terebra taiwanensis Aubry, 1999
 Terebra takauensis Terryn, 2021
 Terebra taurina (Lightfoot, 1786) - flame auger
 † Terebra telegdi Finlay, 1927 
 † Terebra tenisoni Finlay, 1927
 Terebra terryni Poppe, Tagaro & Goto, 2018
 † Terebra teschi Finlay, 1930 
 Terebra tessellata Gray, 1834
 † Terebra tjidamarensis K. Martin, 1880 
 Terebra tricolor Sowerby, 1825
 Terebra triseriata Gray, 1834
 Terebra twilae Bouchet, 1982
 † Terebra undulifera G. B. Sowerby I, 1846 
 Terebra unicolor Preston, 1908
 Terebra vanuatuensis Aubry, 1999
 Terebra vanwalleghemi Terryn, 2017
 Terebra vappereaui Tröndlé, Boutet & Terryn, 2013
 Terebra venilia Tenison-Woods, 1880
 Terebra vicdani Kosuge, 1981
 Terebra virgo Schepman, 1913
 † Terebra vredenburgi Finlay, 1930 
 Terebra waikikiensis Pilsbry, 1921

Nomen dubium
 Terebra bicincta Hinds, 1844
 Terebra dispar Deshayes, 1859
 Terebra tuberosa Hinds, 1844
 Terebra violascens Hinds, 1844
Uncertain status
 Terebra walkeri Smith, 1899 (is a species of Cerithiidae)

Synonyms
This list is incomplete
 Terebra aciculina Reeve, 1860: synonym of Hastula aciculina (Lamarck, 1822) (original combination)
 Terebra acrior Dall, 1889: synonym of Neoterebra acrior (Dall, 1889)
 Terebra affinis Gray, 1834: synonym of Myurella affinis (Gray, 1834)
 Terebra alagoensis De Lima, Tenorio & De Barros, 2007: synonym of Neoterebra alagoensis (S. Lima, Tenorio & Barros, 2007)
 Terebra alba Gray, 1834: synonym of Neoterebra alba (Gray, 1834)
 Terebra alisi Aubry, 1999: synonym of Myurellopsis alisi (Aubry, 1999)
 Terebra allyni Bratcher & Burch, 1970: synonym of Neoterebra allyni (Bratcher & R. D. Burch, 1970)
 Terebra alveolata Hinds, 1844: synonym of Maculauger alveolatus (Hinds, 1844)
 Terebra ambrosia Melvill, 1912: synonym of Punctoterebra polygyrata (Deshayes, 1859)
 Terebra anseeuwi Terryn, 2005: synonym of Profunditerebra anseeuwi (Terryn, 2005)
 Terebra arabella Thiele, 1925: synonym of Punctoterebra arabella (Thiele, 1925)
 Terebra arcas Abbott, 1954 - Arcas auger: synonym of Neoterebra arcas (Abbott, 1954)
 Terebra armillata Hinds, 1844: synonym of Neoterebra armillata (Hinds, 1844)
 Terebra assimilis Pease, 1869: synonym of Punctoterebra plumbea (Quoy & Gaimard, 1833)
 Terebra assu Simone, 2012: synonym of Neoterebra assu (Simone, 2012)
 Terebra aubryi Gargiulo & Terryn, 2018: synonym of Punctoterebra aubryi (Gargiulo & Terryn, 2018)
 Terebra awajiensis Pilsbry, 1904: synonym of Punctoterebra awajiensis (Pilsbry, 1904)
 Terebra ballina (Hedley, 1915): synonym of Punctoterebra ballina (Hedley, 1915)
 Terebra barbieri Aubry, 2008: synonym of Oxymeris barbieri (Aubry, 2008) (original combination)
 Terebra benthalis Dall, 1889: synonym of Duplicaria benthalis (Dall, 1889)
 Terebra bermonti Lorois, 1857: synonym of Punctoterebra succincta (Gmelin, 1791)
 Terebra berryi Campbell, 1961: synonym of Neoterebra berryi (G. B. Campbell, 1961)
 Terebra bifrons Hinds, 1844: synonym of Pristiterebra bifrons (Hinds, 1844)
 Terebra biminiensis (Petuch, 1987): synonym of Neoterebra biminiensis (Petuch, 1987)
 Terebra bourguignati Deshayes, 1859: synonym of Punctoterebra plumbea (Quoy & Gaimard, 1833)
 Terebra brandi Bratcher & Burch, 1970: synonym of Neoterebra brandi (Bratcher & R. D. Burch, 1970)
 Terebra brasiliensis (Smith, 1873): synonym of Neoterebra brasiliensis (E. A. Smith, 1873)
 Terebra brianhayesi Terryn & Sprag, 2008: synonym of Pellifronia brianhayesi (Terryn & Sprague, 2008)
 Terebra bridgesi Dall, 1908: synonym of Neoterebra bridgesi (Dall, 1908)
 Terebra caliginosa Deshayes, 1859: synonym of Punctoterebra caliginosa (Deshayes, 1859)
 Terebra campbelli R. D. Burch, 1965: synonym of Maculauger campbelli (R. D. Burch, 1965)
 Terebra cancellata Gray, 1834: synonym of Terebra cancellata Quoy & Gaimard, 1833
 Terebra cancellata Quoy & Gaimard, 1833: synonym of Punctoterebra succincta (Gmelin, 1791)
 Terebra capensis (E. A. Smith, 1873): synonym of Gradaterebra capensis (E. A. Smith, 1873)
 Terebra carolae Bratcher, 1979: synonym of Neoterebra carolae (Bratcher, 1979)
 Terebra casta Hinds, 1844: synonym of Hastula casta (Hinds, 1844)
 Terebra castaneofusca Thiele, 1925: synonym of Punctoterebra castaneofusca (Thiele, 1925)
 Terebra castigata A. H. Cooke, 1885: synonym of Maculauger castigatus (A. H. Cooke, 1885)
 Terebra cerithina Lamarck, 1822: synonym of Oxymeris cerithina (Lamarck, 1822)
 Terebra cernica Sowerby, 1894: synonym of Punctoterebra nitida (Hinds, 1844)
 Terebra churea Campbell, 1964: synonym of Neoterebra churea (G. B. Campbell, 1964)
 Terebra cinctella Deshayes, 1859: synonym of Maculauger cinctellus (Deshayes, 1859)
 Terebra cinerea (Born, 1778): synonym of Hastula cinerea (Born, 1778)
 Terebra circumcincta Deshayes, 1857 is a synonym for Perirhoe circumcincta (Deshayes, 1857)
 Terebra clappi Pilsbry, 1921: synonym of Punctoterebra plumbea (Quoy & Gaimard, 1833)
 Terebra colombiensis Simone & Gracia, 2006: synonym of Neoterebra colombiensis (Simone & Gracia, 2006)
 Terebra colorata Bratcher, 1988: synonym of Hastula colorata Bratcher, 1988 (taxon inquirendum)
 Terebra concava (Say, 1826): synonym of Neoterebra concava (Say, 1826) - concave auger
 Terebra consors Hinds, 1844: synonym of Oxymeris consors (Hinds, 1844)
 Terebra contigua Pease, 1871: synonym of Punctoterebra plumbea (Quoy & Gaimard, 1833)
 Terebra contracta (Smith, 1873): synonym of Punctoterebra contracta (E. A. Smith, 1873)
 Terebra corintoensis Pilsbry & Lowe, 1932: synonym ofNeoterebra corintoensis (Pilsbry & Lowe, 1932)
 Terebra crassireticula (Lopes de Simone, 1999): synonym of Neoterebra crassireticula (Lopes de Simone, 1999)
 Terebra crassireticulata (Lopes de Simone & Verissimo, 1995): synonym of Terebra crassireticula Simone, 1999
 Terebra crenifera Deshayes, 1859: synonym of Neoterebra crenifera (Deshayes, 1859) - western crenate auger
 Terebra crenulata (Linnaeus, 1758): synonym of Acus crenulata
 Terebra daniae Aubry, 2008: synonym of Hastula daniae (Aubry, 2008)
 Terebra dislocata (Say, 1822): synonym of Neoterebra dislocata (Say, 1822) - eastern auger
 Terebra doellojuradoi Carcelles, 1953: synonym of Neoterebra doellojuradoi (Carcelles, 1953)
 Terebra duplicata (Linnaeus, 1758): synonym of Duplicaria duplicata (Linnaeus, 1758)
 Terebra dussumierii Kiener, 1839: synonym of Duplicaria dussumierii (Kiener, 1839)
 Terebra edgarii Melvill, 1898: synonym of Duplicaria spectabilis (Hinds, 1844)
 Terebra efatensis Aubry, 1999: synonym of Teremitra efatensis (Aubry, 1999)
 Terebra elata Hinds, 1844: synonym of Neoterebra elata (Hinds, 1844)
 Terebra evelynae Clench & Aguayo, 1939: synonym of Profunditerebra evelynae (Clench & Aguayo, 1939)
 Terebra evoluta Deshayes, 1859: synonym of Duplicaria evoluta (Deshayes, 1859)
 Terebra exigua Deshayes, 1859: synonym of Punctoterebra textilis (Hinds, 1844)
 Terebra exiguoides Schepman, 1913: synonym of Punctoterebra exiguoides (Schepman, 1913)
 Terebra fenestrata Hinds, 1844: synonym of Triplostephanus fenestratus Hinds, 1844)
 Terebra flavescens Deshayes, 1859: synonym of Punctoterebra succincta (Gmelin, 1791)
 Terebra flavofasciata Pilsbry, 1921: synonym of Myurella flavofasciata (Pilsbry, 1921)
 Terebra frigata Hinds, 1844: synonym of Neoterebra frigata (Hinds, 1844)
 Terebra fuscotaeniata Thiele, 1925: synonym of Punctoterebra fuscotaeniata (Thiele, 1925)
 Terebra glossema Schwengel, 1942: synonym of Neoterebra glossema (Schwengel, 1942) - tongue auger
 Terebra guayaquilensis (Smith, 1880): synonym of Neoterebra guayaquilensis (Smith, 1880)
 Terebra guphilae Poppe, Tagaro & Terryn, 2009: synonym of Myurellopsis guphilae (Poppe, Tagaro & Terryn, 2009)
 Terebra hancocki Bratcher & Burch, 1970: synonym of Neoterebra hancocki (Bratcher & Burch, 1970)
 Terebra hemphilli Vanatta, 1924: synonym of Neoterebra hemphilli (Vanatta, 1924)
 Terebra hiscocki Sprague, 2004: synonym of Profunditerebra hiscocki (Sprague, 2004)
 Terebra hizenensis Pilsbry, 1904: synonym of Punctoterebra textilis (Hinds, 1844)
 Terebra hoffmeyeri Abbott, 1952: synonym of Punctoterebra plumbea (Quoy & Gaimard, 1833)
 Terebra incisa Faber, 2007: synonym of Neoterebra incisa (Faber, 2007)
 Terebra inflexa Pease, 1869: synonym of Punctoterebra swainsoni (Deshayes, 1859)
 Terebra intertincta Hinds, 1844: synonym of Neoterebra intertincta (Hinds, 1844)
 Terebra intumescyra De Lima, Tenorio & De Barros, 2007: synonym of Neoterebra intumescyra (S. Lima, Tenorio & Barros, 2007)
 Terebra isabella Thiele, 1925: synonym of Punctoterebra isabella (Thiele, 1925)
 * Terebra jacquelinae Bratcher & Burch, 1970: synonym of Neoterebra jacquelinae (Bratcher & Burch, 1970)
 Terebra japonica E. A. Smith, 1873: synonym of Punctoterebra japonica (E. A. Smith, 1873)
 Terebra juanica Dall & Simpson, 1901: synonym of Neoterebra juanica (Dall & Simpson, 1901)
 Terebra jungi Lai, 2001: synonym of Pellifronia jungi (Lai, 2001)
 Terebra kilburni R.D. Burch, 1965: synonym of Myurella kilburni (R.D. Burch, 1965)
 Terebra lamyi Terryn, 2011: synonym of Neoterebra lamyi (Terryn, 2011)
 Terebra lanceata Reeve, 1860: synonym of Hastula lanceata (Linnaeus, 1767)
 Terebra larvaeformis Hinds, 1844: synonym of Neoterebra larvaeformis (Hinds, 1844)
 Terebra leptapsis Simone, 1999: synonym of Neoterebra leptapsis (Simone, 1999)
 Terebra limatula Dall, 1889: synonym of Neoterebra limatula (Dall, 1889)
 Terebra lischkeana Dunker, 1877: synonym of Punctoterebra lischkeana (Dunker, 1877)
 Terebra livida Reeve, 1860: synonym of Punctoterebra livida (Reeve, 1860)
 Terebra longiscata Deshayes, 1859: synonym of Punctoterebra longiscata (Deshayes, 1859)
 Terebra lucana Dall, 1908: synonym of Neoterebra lucana (Dall, 1908)
 Terebra matheroniana Deshayes, 1859: synonym of Hastula matheroniana (Deshayes, 1859)
 Terebra mediapacifica: synonym of Hastula albula (Menke, 1843)
 Terebra mindanaoensis Aubry, 2008: synonym of Myurella mindanaoensis (Aubry, 2008)
 Terebra mugridgeae García, 1999: synonym of Neoterebra mugridgeae (García, 1999)
 Terebra nadinae Aubry, 2008: synonym of Duplicaria nadinae (Aubry, 2008)
 Terebra nassula Dall, 1889: synonym of Neoterebra nassula (Dall, 1889) - woven auger
 Terebra nathaliae (Drivas & Jay, 1988): synonym of Myurellopsis nathaliae (Drivas & Jay, 1988)
 Terebra nebulosa Sowerby, 1825: synonym of Myurella nebulosa (Sowerby, 1825)
 Terebra ningaloensis Aubry, 1999: synonym of Myurella ningaloensis (Aubry, 1999)
 Terebra ninfae Campbell, 1961: synonym of Gradaterebra ninfae (Campbell, 1961)
 Terebra nitida Hinds, 1844: synonym of Strioterebrum nitidum (Hinds, 1844)
 Terebra oculata Lamarck, 1822: synonym of Terebra guttata (Röding, 1798)
 Terebra omanensis Gargiulo, 2018: synonym of Profunditerebra omanensis (Gargiulo, 2018)
 Terebra orientalis Aubry, 1999: synonym of Profunditerebra orientalis (Aubry, 1999)
 Terebra pacei Petuch, 1987: synonym of Neoterebra pacei (Petuch, 1987)
 Terebra panamensis Dall, 1908: synonym of Neoterebra panamensis (Dall, 1908)
 Terebra paucincisa Bratcher, 1988: synonym of Punctoterebra paucincisa (Bratcher, 1988)
 Terebra pedroana Dall, 1908: synonym of Neoterebra pedroana (Dall, 1908)
 Terebra penicillata Hinds, 1844: synonym of Hastula penicillata (Hinds, 1844)
 Terebra pertusa (Born, 1778): synonym of Myurella pertusa (Born, 1778)
 Terebra plicata Gray, 1834: synonym of Neoterebra plicata (Gray, 1834)
 Terebra plicatella Deshayes, 1857: synonym of Punctoterebra nitida (Hinds, 1844)
 Terebra plumbea Quoy & Gaimard, 1833: synonym of Punctoterebra plumbea (Quoy & Gaimard, 1833)
 Terebra polygyrata Deshayes, 1859: synonym of Punctoterebra polygyrata (Deshayes, 1859)
 Terebra polypenus Pilsbry & Lowe, 1932: synonym of Microtrypetes polypenus (Pilsbry & Lowe, 1932)
 Terebra poppei Terryn, 2003: synonym of Profunditerebra poppei (Terryn, 2003)
 Terebra protexta (Conrad, 1846): synonym of Neoterebra protexta (Conrad, 1846)
 Terebra pseudofortunei Aubry, 2008: synonym of Myurella pseudofortunei (Aubry, 2008)
 Terebra punctata Gray, 1834: synonym of Terebra corrugata Lamarck, 1822
 Terebra rancheria Bratcher, 1988: synonym of Neoterebra rancheria (Bratcher, 1988)
 Terebra raphanula Lamarck, 1822: synonym of Hastula raphanula (Lamarck, 1822)
 Terebra remanalva Melvill, 1910: synonym of Duplicaria spectabilis (Hinds, 1844)
 Terebra roperi Pilsbry & Lowe, 1932: synonym of Neoterebra roperi (Pilsbry & Lowe, 1932)
 Terebra rosacea Pease, 1869: synonym of Punctoterebra rosacea (Pease, 1869)
 Terebra roseata A. Adams & Reeve, 1850: synonym of Punctoterebra roseata (A. Adams & Reeve, 1850)
 Terebra rushii Dall, 1889: synonym of Neoterebra rushii (Dall, 1889) - porcelain auger
 Terebra sandrinae Aubry, 2008: synonym of Partecosta sandrinae (Aubry, 2008)
 Terebra sanjuanensis Pilsbry & H. N. Lowe, 1932: synonym of Neoterebra sanjuanensis (Pilsbry & H. N. Lowe, 1932)
 Terebra shyana Bratcher & Burch, 1970: synonym of Neoterebra shyana (Bratcher & Burch, 1970)
 Terebra simonei De Lima, Tenorio & De Barros, 2007: synonym of Neoterebra simonei (De Lima, Tenorio & De Barros, 2007)
 Terebra sorrentensis Aubry, 1999: synonym of Gradaterebra sorrentensis (Aubry, 1999)
 Terebra souleyeti Deshayes, 1859: synonym of Punctoterebra souleyeti (Deshayes, 1859)
 Terebra spirosulcata Simone, 1999: synonym of Neoterebra spirosulcata (Simone, 1999)
 Terebra sterigma Simone, 1999: synonym of Neoterebra sterigma (Simone, 1999)
 Terebra sterigmoides Simone & Gracia, 2006: synonym of Neoterebra sterigmoides (Simone & Gracia, 2006)
 Terebra stohleri Bratcher & Burch, 1970: synonym of Neoterebra stohleri (Bratcher & Burch, 1970)
 Terebra subtextilis E. A. Smith, 1879: synonym of Punctoterebra textilis (Hinds, 1844)
 Terebra subulata Lamarck, 1816 synonym of Terebra areolata A. Adams & Reeve, 1850, itself a synonym of Myurella kilburni (Burch, 1965)
 Terebra succincta (Gmelin, 1791): synonym of Punctoterebra succincta (Gmelin, 1791)
 Terebra swainsoni Deshayes, 1859: synonym of Punctoterebra swainsoni (Deshayes, 1859)
 Terebra thaanumi Pilsbry, 1921: synonym of Acus thaanumi (Pilsbry, 1921)
 Terebra tenuis Li, 1930 †: synonym of Pristiterebra tuberculosa (Hinds, 1844)
 Terebra textilis Hinds, 1844: synonym of Punctoterebra textilis (Hinds, 1844)
 Terebra tiarella Deshayes, 1857: synonym of Neoterebra tiarella (Deshayes, 1857)
 Terebra tiurensis Schepman, 1913: synonym of Punctoterebra tiurensis (Schepman, 1913)
 Terebra tricincta Smith, 1877: synonym of Duplicaria tricincta (E. A. Smith, 1877)
 Terebra trismacaria Melvill, 1917: synonym of Punctoterebra trismacaria (Melvill, 1917)
 Terebra turrita (E. A. Smith, 1873): synonym of Punctoterebra turrita (E. A. Smith, 1873)
 Terebra turschi Bratcher, 1981: synonym of Punctoterebra turschi (Bratcher, 1981)
 Terebra undatella Deshayes, 1859: synonym of Punctoterebra succincta (Gmelin, 1791)
 Terebra undulata Gray, 1834;: synonym of Myurella undulata (Gray, 1834)
 Terebra variegata]' Gray, 1834: synonym of Neoterebra variegata (Gray, 1834)
 Terebra vaubani Aubry, 1999: synonym of Myurellopsis vaubani (Aubry, 1999)
 Terebra veliae Aubry, 1991: synonym of Partecosta veliae (Aubry, 1991)
 Terebra vinosa Dall, 1889: synonym of Neoterebra vinosa (Dall, 1889) - lilac auger
 Terebra zebra Kiener, 1837: synonym of Oxymeris strigata'' (G. B. Sowerby I, 1825)

References

External links
 Fedosov, A. E.; Malcolm, G.; Terryn, Y.; Gorson, J.; Modica, M. V.; Holford, M.; Puillandre, N. (2020). Phylogenetic classification of the family Terebridae (Neogastropoda: Conoidea). Journal of Molluscan Studies

Terebridae
Gastropod genera